Rama Talkies Road is a major road in the Indian city of Visakhapatnam. The name of the road is derived from a movie theater that is located nearby. It is one of the busiest roads that connects to Dwaraka Bus Station.

References

 

Roads in Visakhapatnam
Neighbourhoods in Visakhapatnam